Maxera marchalii is a moth of the family Erebidae.

Distribution
It is found in Africa, where it is known from Congo, Comoros, Uganda, Kenya, Tanzania, Zambia, South Africa, Mauritius, Réunion, Madagascar, Seychelles and Yemen.

References

 images at boldsystems.org
 Africanmoths: images & distribution map

Erebidae
Erebid moths of Africa
Moths described in 1833